Dufty is a surname. Notable people with the surname include:

Alan Dufty (born 1947), Australian Paralympic athlete
Alec Dufty (born 1987), American soccer player and current coach
Alfred William Buchanan Dufty (1858–1924), English-born Australian photographer
Bevan Dufty (born 1955), American politician and Director of HOPE (Housing Opportunity, Partnerships and Engagement)
Craddock Dufty (1900–1955), New Zealand rugby league player
Colin Dufty (1889–1967), Australian rules footballer
Francis Herbert Dufty (1846–1910), English-born Australian photographer
John Dufty Lasher (1932–2015), New Zealand rugby league footballer
Matthew Dufty (born 1996), Australian professional rugby league footballer
Ross Dufty (1927–2009), Australian cricketer
William Dufty (1916–2002), American writer, musician, and activist